Day of the Restoration of Latvian Independence is a Latvian national holiday and event, being celebrated annually on 4 May. It marks, like the other Baltic republics, the restoration of the Latvian Republic declaration by the Supreme Soviet of the Latvian SSR on 4 May 1990. This was the official declaration of the Restoration of Independence, and the actual one, that brought also the international recognition, was adopted as a constitutional law "On the Statehood of the Republic of Latvia" by Latvian Supreme Council on 21 August 1991, a day after the Restoration Act of Estonia during August coup. Soviet Union recognised Estonia, Latvia, Lithuania as independent states on 6 September 1991. Russian SFSR did so already on 24 August 1991.

Observances
The Freedom Celebration or the 4 May Freedom Celebration is an annual military parade in Latvia which has been held since 2012 in honor of the Day of the Restoration of Latvian Independence. It is one of the main events of the day. The parade is usually the first of two full military parades held per year in the country, with the other being held on 11 November, Lāčplēsis Day (Latvian: Lāčplēša diena), the commemoration day for soldiers who fought for the independence of Latvia. Every year, the parade is held in various Latvian cities outside of the capital of Riga. The parade usually starts at 11:00 am and typically involves around between 500-1,000 troops of the Latvian National Armed Forces, including personnel representing the Land Forces, Navy, Air Force, National Guard, State Border Guard, Special Tasks Unit, Military Police and military academies. Being a NATO member, the parade also features military servicemen from NATO countries such as the United States, Canada and Germany. The following is a list of parades by year:

 Rēzekne (2012)
 Kuldīga (2013)
 Valmiera (2014)
 Jelgava (2015)
 Krāslava (2016)
 Liepāja (2017)
 Madona (2018)

If the holiday is on a weekend date, the following Monday is an observance date. As per the Riga celebrations, a flower laying ceremony is always held at the capital's Freedom Monument.

In 2016 an initiative called "White Tablecloth Day" was launched by the Ministry of Culture in context of Latvian Centennial celebration (2018) inviting people of all communities to gather around a table and celebrate together. The goal of White Tablecloth Celebration is to strengthen the tradition of gathering family, friends, neighbours, and communities around the table on 4 May to consciously celebrate our country and honour those who helped to create and protect it. We generate the feeling of celebration together on White Tablecloth Day as each person brings something to add to the table and to the conversation. White Tablecloth Day is a reminder that the restoration of the independence of the Republic of Latvia was the result of relentless action, courage and audacity of certain individuals.

References

External links

 Day of the Restoration of Independence of the Republic of Latvia. Saeima.
 Latvia 100
 

Public holidays in Latvia
Latvia
May observances
Summer events in Latvia